Ali Rıza Bilal (born 2 April 1966) is a Turkish rower. He competed in the men's single sculls event at the 1992 Summer Olympics.

References

External links
 
 

1966 births
Living people
Turkish male rowers
Olympic rowers of Turkey
Rowers at the 1992 Summer Olympics
Place of birth missing (living people)